Tetsuya is a masculine Japanese given name.

Possible writings 
Tetsuya can be written using different kanji characters and can mean:

 哲也, "philosophy, to be"
 鉄也, "iron, to be"
 哲哉, "philosophy, alas"
 徹也, "devotion, to be"
 徹矢, "penetrate, arrow"
 鉄弥, "iron, increasingly"

The name can also be written in hiragana てつや or katakana テツヤ.

People with the name 
Tetsuya (dancer) (born 1981), Japanese dancer
Tetsuya (musician) (born 1969), Japanese musician
, Japanese footballer
 Tetsuya Asano (浅野 哲也, born 1967) is a former Japanese football player and manager
 Tetsuya Chiba (てつや, born 1939), Japanese manga artist
 Tetsuya Chikushi (哲也, 1935–2008), Japanese newscaster
Tetsuya Endo (disambiguation), multiple people
 Tetsuya Enomoto (哲也, born 1983), Japanese football player
 Tetsuya Fujii (哲也), a Japanese astronomer
, Japanese shogi player
 Tetsuya Theodore "Ted" Fujita (哲也, 1920–1998), Japanese severe storms researcher
 Tetsuya Funatsu (舩津 徹也, born 1987) is a Japanese football player
 Tetsuya Harada (哲也, born 1970), Japanese former GP motorcycle racer
 Tetsuya Hibino (哲也, born 1974), Japanese professional drifting driver
 Tetsuya Ichimura (哲也, born 1930), Japanese photographer
 Tetsuya Ishida (徹也, 1973–2005), Japanese painter
, Japanese footballer
 Tetsuya Iwanaga (哲哉, born 1970), Japanese voice actor
 Tetsuya Kajiwara (drummer) (徹也, born 1963), Japanese drummer
 Tetsuya Kakihara (徹也, born 1982), Japanese voice actor
 Tetsuya Kakiuchi (垣内 哲也, born 1970) is a Japanese former Nippon Professional Baseball outfielder
 Tetsuya Kiyonari (哲也, born 1961), Japanese professional Go player
, Japanese footballer
, Japanese baseball player
 Tetsuya Komuro (哲哉, born 1958), Japanese keyboardist, songwriter and music producer
, Japanese ballet dancer
 Tetsuya Makita (哲也, born 1984), Japanese actor
 Tetsuya Matoyama (哲也, born 1970), Japanese professional baseball catcher
, Japanese baseball player
 Tetsuya Mizuguchi (哲也, born 1965), Japanese video game designer and producer
, Japanese football manager
 Tetsuya Naito (哲也, born 1982), Japanese professional wrestler
 Tetsuya Nakashima (哲也, born 1959), Japanese film director
, Japanese sumo wrestler
, Japanese artist, printmaker and educator
 Tetsuya Nomura (哲也, born 1970), Japanese video game director
 Tetsuya Ōkubo (大久保 哲哉, born 1980) is a Japanese football player
 Tetsuya Ota (哲也, born 1959), Japanese racecar driver
, Japanese ice hockey player
 Tetsuya Saruwatari (哲也, born 1958), Japanese manga artist
 Tetsuya Shibata (徹也, born 1973), video game music composer
 Tetsuya Shimizu (清水 哲也, born 1983), Japanese professional wrestler
 Tetsuya Shikawa 鉄也, Japanese politician
 Tetsuya Shiroo (哲彌, born 1948), Japanese yakuza
 Tetsuya Takahashi (哲哉, born 1966), Japanese video game creator
 Tetsuya Takeda (鉄矢), Japanese singer and actor
 Tetsuya Takehora (竹洞哲也, born 1974) is a Japanese film director and screenwriter.
 Tetsuya Tanaka (田中哲也, born 1965) is a Japanese racing driver
, Japanese footballer and manager
 Tetsuya Utsumi (内海 哲也, born 1982) is a Japanese professional baseball player
 Tetsuya Wakuda (哲也, born 1959), Japanese-born Australian chef
 Tetsuya Watari (哲也, born 1941), Japanese stage, film, and television actor
 Tetsuya Yamagami (山上 徹也), the only suspect in the assassination of former prime minister Shinzo Abe 
, Japanese baseball player
, Japanese baseball player
 Tetsuya Yanagisawa (テツヤ), Japanese anime director
 Tetsuya Yoneda (哲也, born 1938), Japanese professional baseball pitcher
, Japanese long-distance runner

Fictional characters 
 Tetsuya Azuma (鉄也), protagonist of the 1973 anime series Casshan and of the 2004 film Casshern
 Tetsuya Kajiwara (Fushigi Yūgi) (哲也), in the manga and anime series Fushigi Yūgi
 Tetsuya Kuroko, the protagonist of the manga and anime series Kuroko's Basketball
 Tetsuya Kijiyama, a childhood friend of Torao in the manga series Gender-Swap at the Delinquent Academy
 Tetsuya Sendo, a friend of Ritsu Kasanoda in the manga and anime series Ouran High School Host Club
 Tetsuya Takahashi, in Haruki Murakami's novel After Dark
 Tetsuya Tsurugi (鉄也), the protagonist of manga and anime series Great Mazinger
 Tetsuya Watarigani, a recurring character in the anime series Beyblade: Metal Fusion
 Tetsuya Yuuki (哲也), in the manga and anime series Ace of Diamond
 Tetsuya, Japanese name of Tyson from Pokémon: Advanced Battle
 Tetsuya Yano, a character from Choujuu Sentai Liveman
 Tetsuya from Yokai Watch

See also 
 4343 Tetsuya, a main-belt asteroid
 Legendary Gambler Tetsuya, a gambling manga
 Tetsuya's, a restaurant in Sydney, Australia

Japanese masculine given names